Martin Kuba (born 9 April 1973) is a Czech politician who served as Minister of Industry and Trade of the Czech Republic from November 2011 to July 2013. He was appointed to Petr Nečas's Cabinet on 16 November 2011. Since November 2020 he has been the Governor of the South Bohemian Region.

Education and profession
Kuba graduated from the Secondary Industrial School of Civil Engineering in České Budějovice in 1991, before deciding to become a doctor. He studied at Bílá Vločka Secondary Medical School, majoring in paramedics. He continued his studies at the First Medical Faculty of Charles University, graduating in 2002. From then he worked as a doctor in the Emergency Medical Service and as an anesthesiologist at the Department of Cardiac Surgery. From 1996 to 1998, he worked for PSM, a pyramid scheme. In 2004 he became the operator of the Fornetti bakery in Budějovice and in 2007 he founded the Fruit Frog chain of stores.

During his tenure as Deputy Governor of the South Bohemian Region, he retained a one-fifth job at the České Budějovice Hospital, and was also a member of its Supervisory Board. In his property declaration, he listed remuneration for his membership of the board of directors of the České Budějovice heating plant, which belongs 80% to the city (together with dividends he came to 150 thousand crowns, ended here after the municipal elections). Fruit Frog cocktails. After his appointment as minister, he stated that he would transfer this small business to members of his family so that he would not participate in it. After leaving the Ministry of Industry and Trade, together with Adam Kotalík, they ensured further production at Fiantex. He bought Texsr from Mr. Šrajer.

Political career

Early career
He joined the Civic Democratic Party. He was elected member of České Budějovice municipal assembly in 2006. He became leader of South Bohemian Civic Democratic Party in 2008 after resignation of previous leader Tom Zajíček. Kuba received 97 od 127 votes. During 2010 party convention Kuba ran for the position of Deputy Leader of the Party. Party leader Petr Nečas stated that his victory wouldn't be good for the party. Kuba wans't elected

Kuba ran for České Budějovice municipal assembly in 2010 on 11th place on the list. ODS won only 8 seat and Kuba thus wasn't elected. Petr Nečas publicly called party representatives who failed in the election to resign but Kuba remained in the position. Kuba became member of the municipal assembly once again on 10 March 2011 after resignation of three ambassadors elected in the election. In November 2011 Kuba was reelected leader of South Bohemian organisation.

Minister and Party leader
Kuba became a member of Petr Nečas' Cabinet on 16 November 2011 replacing Michal Doktor as Minister of Industry and Trade. Kuba then ran for the position of the Deputy leader of the Civic Democratic Party on party convention in 2012 facing Miroslava Němcová. Kuba received 363 votes against Němcová's 142 and won the position. After fall of the cabinet Petr Nečas resigned to the position of party leader and  Kuba became acting leader of the Civic Democratic Party but Miroslava Němcová became electoral leader of the Civic Democratic Party in 2013 Czech legislative election. He ran for the Chamber of Deputies in the election but wasn't elected as the party suffered heavy losses.

Kuba decided to not defend position of Party leader and instead supported candidacy of Petr Fiala for 2014 Civic Democratic Party leadership election. Fiala won the leadership election replacing Kuba as party leader.

Municipal and regional politics
Kuba ran in 2014 municipal election for České Budějovice assembly but wasn't elected. He became a member of the South Bohemian regional assembly in the 2016 election. Kuba ran for the position of České Budějovice Mayor in 2018 municipal election in an attempt for political comeback. ODS received 8 seats in municipal assembly and remaine in opposition.

Kuba then led ODS during 2020 regional election in South Bohemia. ODS had strong performance during the election receiving 17.5% and gaining 12 seats being tied with ANO 2011. Kuba then formed  coalition with KDU-ČSL, TOP 09, Czech Social Democratic Party and South Bohemians. Kuba became the new Governor. On 2 December 2020 Kuba was elected Chairman of the Regional Association.

Kuba gained widespread media attention during COVID-19 pandemic in the Czech Republic when he introduced Conception of Vaccination centres.

References

1973 births
Industry and Trade ministers of the Czech Republic
Living people
Politicians from České Budějovice
Civic Democratic Party (Czech Republic) Government ministers
Leaders of the Civic Democratic Party (Czech Republic)
Charles University alumni
Civic Democratic Party (Czech Republic) governors